Lincoln College is a predominantly further education college based in the City of Lincoln, England.

The college's main site is on Monks Road (B1308), specifically to the north, and to the south of Lindum Hill (A15). It was formerly known as the Lincoln College of Technology and was one of the sites for North Lincolnshire College.

Satellite sites

The college also has sites in Gainsborough, and also in Newark-on-Trent in Nottinghamshire (since merging with the former Newark and Sherwood College in 2007).

The two branch sites are branded as Gainsborough College and Newark College respectively.

More than 11,000 students are enrolled across the three sites, making it one of the largest educational establishments in the county of Lincolnshire. The college closed its small fourth campus in Louth, Lincolnshire in 2005.

History

The college was earlier known as Lincoln Technical College and built on Cathedral Street in 1932.

It became Lincoln College of Technology in the early 1970s, then administered by the City of Lincoln Education Committee. In the mid-1980s the college piloted the Technician Engineering Scholarship Scheme (TESS), funded by the Engineering Industry Training Board, a scheme for women.

North Lincolnshire College (known as NLC from 1989) was created on 1 September 1987 by Lincolnshire County Council from combining the Lincoln site with Gainsborough College of Further Education and part of the Louth Further Education Centre.

It previously had its headquarters on Cathedral Street until 1993. In the early 1990s it offered degrees and HNDs in Business Studies, Electronics, and Computer Studies in conjunction with Nottingham Trent University, becoming an associate college in 1994. In 1997 the Principal, Allan Crease, in a speech to the Association of Colleges criticised the means of funding from the Further Education Funding Council for England (FEFC), where money was allocated by numbers at the college, and staff received less pay than those at school.

In the late 1990s the University of Lincoln was being developed, subsuming Lincoln College of Art, and offered similar courses to the college, but the university was not fully built until the mid-2000s. In the late 1990s the college had a student population of around 15,000 and over 20,000 by 2001.

It soon after changed its name to Lincoln College, not least because North Lincolnshire was an area not covered by the college. From 2010 it was funded by the East Midlands LSC, based in Leicester, although the local LSC office was based nearby on Kingsley Road in North Hykeham.

In 2006 Lincoln College acquired the site of a former Tradex cash and carry store. The college plans to make this into a multi purpose drama and music facility. The new building will be state of the art and include a theatre, recording studios and rehearsal spaces. The project is being prepared and will be finished by the start of the 2007–2008 academic year.

Buildings

Eight different buildings make up Lincoln College's main site, including the Abbey, Gibney, Sessions, Bishops and Cathedral Buildings. Bishops Building, located to the back of the site, contains a technology school. This has electronics courses including BTEC National Diploma Electrical and Electronic Engineering course.

City of Lincoln School
Part of the college, the Gibney Building, is the site of the former City School, previously the Lincoln Technical School, which for a time became the headquarters of the Lincoln Archaeological Trust in the early 1970s.

From November 1940, boys from the Bablake School in Coventry were evacuated to the City of Lincoln School for two and a half years. Girls from Bablake School were evacuated to South Park High School for Girls (now Priory LSST). Roundhay Grammar School had been evacuated to Lincoln School (now LCHS) on Wragby Road.

The school had around 600 boys in the 1960s. Former members of this school have their City School Lincoln Association.

Curriculum
The automotive technology program at Lincoln College includes training in fuel systems, electrical systems, driving diagnostics and transmissions, and techniques to install, repair and maintain vehicles. There are higher education courses in Computing Higher National Diplomas in Internet and Computer Science & NVQ in Logistics Operations Management. Instructors are certified through the Automotive Service of Excellence (ASE). areas. The college has higher education links with universities including the University of Lincoln and Nottingham Trent University.

Alumni

 Jason Bradbury, host of The Gadget Show
 Karen Lee, former MP for Lincoln

City Grammar School
 Sir Francis Hill CBE, chancellor from 1972 to 1978 of the University of Nottingham 1900–1907
 Brig. Harry Hopthrow CBE, director from 1943 to 1945 of Fortifications and Works of the War Office 1908–1915
 Sir Denis Follows CBE, Chairman of the British Olympic Association from 1977 to 1983 and president from 1930 to 1932 of the National Union of Students 1918–1923
 Prof Hermann Arthur Jahn, Professor of Applied Mathematics from 1949 to 1972 at the University of Southampton, and who with Edward Teller discovered the Jahn–Teller effect 1908–1915
 Frank Rose CBE FRS, chemist, Research Manager from 1954 to 1971 of the Pharmaceutical Division of ICI where he developed sulphamerazine, and developed the anti-malaria drug Paludrine during the war 1920–1927
 Prof John Harris CBE, zoologist and Vice Chancellor from 1966 to 1968 of the University of Bristol 1922–1929
 Frank Scrimshaw, Director General of Electronics R&D from 1967 to 1972 at the Ministry of Technology 1929–1936
 Dr Frank Panton CBE, director of part of the UK's Polaris missile project, and director from 1980 to 1983 of the Royal Armament Research and Development Establishment 1934–1941
 Commander John Wilson MBE, former head in the 1970s of the Metropolitan Police's Special Branch 1938–1945 (his father was the headmaster)
 Prof Ronald Bell CB, Director-General of ADAS from 1984 to 1989 and Chief Scientific Advisor of MAFF, and president from 1985 to 1989 of the British Crop Production Council, and director from 1977 to 1984 of the National Institute of Agricultural Engineering (NIAE, which closed in 2006) at Silsoe 1941–1948
 Tony Worthington, Labour MP from 1987 to 2005 for Clydebank and Milngavie 1953–1960
 Prof David Fowler CBE, Science Director since 2003 of Biogeochemistry at the Centre for Ecology and Hydrology in Edinburgh 1961–1968
 Kevin Cox, former President of the biotechnology company Avecia 1969–1974

See also
 North Lindsey College

References

External links

 The college's website
 Lincoln College Character Area
 EduBase

Education in Lincoln, England
Further education colleges in Lincolnshire
West Lindsey District
Educational institutions established in 1932
1932 establishments in England